Jeson Mor (English: "Nine Horses") is a two-player strategy board game from Mongolia.  It is considered a chess variant. The game is played on a 9×9 checkered gameboard.  Each player has nine chess knights initially lined up on the players' first . A player wins by being first to occupy the central square (square e5) with a knight, and then leave that square.

Equipment
A 9×9 square checkered board is used.  Alternatively, an 8×8 square grid can be used with pieces played on the intersection points.  Each player has a set of nine chess knights in their own color.

Rules
Players decide who is White, who is Black, and who moves first. Players alternate turns. Knights are initially set up on each player's first .  
 Knights move or capture exactly as chess knights.
 On a player's turn, a knight can move to an empty square, or capture an enemy knight. A knight on the central square (e5) may be captured by the opponent. 
 The player first to move a knight to the central square of the board (e5), and then leave that square on a subsequent move, wins the game. An alternative way to win is to capture all the opponent's pieces.

References

Bibliography

External links
Jeson Mor at The World of Abstract Games

Chess variants
Chess in Mongolia